Bryan Murray (born 13 July 1949) is an Irish actor. He is known for his extensive television work which includes Fitz in Strumpet City, Flurry Knox in The Irish R.M., Shifty in Bread (for which he won BBC TV Personality of the Year), Harry Cassidy in Perfect Scoundrels, Trevor Jordache in Brookside and Bob Charles in Fair City.

Early life and theatre career
Murray was born in Dublin, Ireland. As a stage actor, he began his career in Dublin at the Abbey Theatre where, as a member of The Abbey Company, he appeared in over 50 productions. In London, he has been a member of The Royal National Theatre, The Royal Shakespeare Company and has been in many productions in the West End. He has appeared many times at the Gate Theatre in Dublin, most recently in 2013 in My Cousin Rachel adapted for the stage by Joseph O'Connor. In the 2010 Dublin Fringe Festival, he appeared in the award-winning production of Medea at The Samuel Beckett theatre.

Television
Murray is widely known for his extensive television work which includes Fitz in Strumpet City, Flurry Knox in The Irish R.M., Shifty in Bread (for which he won BBC TV Personality of the Year), Harry Cassidy in Perfect Scoundrels, Trevor Jordache in Brookside and Bob Charles in Fair City.
He appeared on the second season of Charity You're a Star where he sang duets with his Fair City co-star Una Crawford O'Brien. The duo were voted off the show after performing "Don't Go Breaking My Heart". He played the role of Lynch in the film, A Portrait of the Artist as a Young Man (1977).

Recently he presented the highly acclaimed and IFTA nominated documentary for TV3 The Tenements, a four-part series charting the rise and fall of the Tenements in Dublin from the 1800s to the mid-1970s. 
He fronted the BBC1 children's religious affairs programmes Knock Knock and Umbrella for three years.  On RTÉ, he had his own prime time TV talk shows Encore and Caught in the Act and presented Saturday Night Live. His nine-part radio series The Sound of Movies was aired on RTÉ Radio 1 in 2008. Most recently he has been a semi regular presenter of Late Date on RTÉ Radio 1. 
In the US, he presented the 'Irish Spring' commercial on network TV for six years, the award-winning 'Pioneer Press' commercials for three years and hosted the St Patrick's Day Parade for PBS Television. 
His series The Big House was shown on TV3 in the spring of 2013.

He co-created and co-devised the ITV series Perfect Scoundrels which ran for three years.
He has co-written two musicals performed at the Abbey Theatre, Dublin, and Irish Theatre Company Dublin; A Happy Go Likeable Man, after Molière, and Thieves Carnival, after Anouilth.
Most recently Murray took part in the 'One City One Book' celebration Bread and Roses; Strumpet City Revisited reading extracts from the book with the RIAAM orchestra playing the theme music from the TV series conducted by the composer Proinnsias O'Duinn at Dublin Castle.

Famous roles
Murray is most famous for the following roles:

 Trevor Jordache in Brookside
 Mr James Roberts in Casualty and Holby City
 Harry Fullerton in The Bill
 Shifty Boswell in Bread
 Flurry Knox in The Irish R.M.
 Harry Cassidy in Perfect Scoundrels
 Bob Fitzpatrick in Strumpet City
 Officer Doyle in Mrs. Santa Claus
 Bob Charles in Fair City

Although Murray's fame increased in the eighties thanks to his role as Flurry Knox in The Irish R.M. and Shifty Boswell in the popular sitcom Bread, his role in Brookside is perhaps the best remembered, despite the character only appearing in the show for eleven episodes in 1993. His character, the wife beater and child abuser Trevor Jordache, was famously stabbed and killed by his wife, Mandy (Sandra Maitland), she and daughter Beth (Anna Friel) later buried his body under the patio, where it was discovered in 1995.

He plays Bob Charles, once owner of McCoys pub but now the owner of The Hungry Pig restaurant, in the RTÉ soap opera Fair City.

Recently he took part in the 'One City-One Book' celebration Bread and Roses; Strumpet City Revisited in which he read extracts from the book with the RIAM orchestra playing the theme music from the TV series conducted by the composer Proinnsias O'Duinn at Dublin Castle.

Filmography

Film

Television

See also
 List of Fair City characters
 List of longest-serving soap opera actors#Ireland

References

External links
 

1949 births
Living people
Irish male soap opera actors
Irish male stage actors
Irish male television actors
Male actors from Dublin (city)
RTÉ Radio 1 presenters
RTÉ television presenters
20th-century Irish male actors
21st-century Irish male actors
Virgin Media Television (Ireland) presenters
You're a Star contestants